Eduardo "Edu" Gil Barranco (born 9 December 1990) is a Spanish footballer who plays for SC Uxama as a defender.

Club career
Born in Soria, Castile and León, Gil finished his development with hometown club CD Numancia, and made his senior debut in 2010–11 with their reserves, in Tercera División. On 27 May 2012 he made his debut with the first team, in a 3–1 away win against CE Sabadell FC in the Segunda División.

After leaving the Nuevo Estadio Los Pajaritos in 2014, Gil spent the rest of his career in Spanish amateur football.

References

External links

1990 births
Living people
People from Soria
Sportspeople from the Province of Soria
Spanish footballers
Footballers from Castile and León
Association football defenders
Segunda División players
Tercera División players
Divisiones Regionales de Fútbol players
CD Numancia B players
CD Numancia players